The 1985 New Jersey General Assembly election will be held on November 5, 1985.

The elections coincided with Governor Tom Kean's landslide re-election. The result was a historic victory for Kean's Republican Party, which gained 14 seats to retake the majority in the Assembly.

Incumbents not running for re-election

Democratic 

 Thomas W. Long (District 20)
 Nicholas LaRocca (District 33)

Republican 
Every Republican incumbent ran for re-election.

Summary of races 
Voters in each legislative district elect two members to the New Jersey General Assembly.

District 1

General election

District 2

General election

District 3

General election

District 4

General election

District 5

General election

District 6

General election

District 7

General election

District 8

General election

District 9

General election

District 10

General election

District 11

General election

District 12

General election

District 13

General election

District 14

General election

District 15

General election

District 16

General election

District 17

General election

District 18

General election

District 19

General election

District 20

General election

District 21

General election

District 22

General election

District 23

General election

District 24

General election

District 25

General election

District 26

General election

District 27

General election

District 28

General election

District 29

General election

District 30

General election

District 31

General election

District 32

General election

District 33

General election

District 34

General election

District 35

General election

District 36

General election

District 37

General election

District 38

General election

District 39

General election

District 40

General election

Notes

References 

1985
New Jersey General Assembly
1985 New Jersey elections